Kuyenzeka Kwenama Praisegod Xaba (born 26 July 1997) is a South African rugby union player for the  in Super Rugby and  in the Currie Cup and the Rugby Challenge. His regular position is flanker.

References

1997 births
Living people
Rugby union flankers
Rugby union players from Durban
South Africa Under-20 international rugby union players
South African rugby union players
Stormers players
Western Province (rugby union) players